Intuitive music is a form of musical improvisation based on instant creation in which fixed principles or rules may or may not have been given. It is a type of process music where instead of a traditional music score, verbal or graphic instructions and ideas are provided to the performers. The concept was introduced in 1968 by the German composer Karlheinz Stockhausen, with specific reference to the collections of text-notated compositions Aus den sieben Tagen (1968) and Für kommende Zeiten (1968–70). The first public performance of intuitive-music text compositions, however, was in the collective work Musik für ein Haus, developed in Stockhausen's 1968 Darmstadt lectures and performed on 1 September 1968, several months before the first realisations of any of the pieces from Aus den sieben Tagen.

Intuitive music may appear to be synonymous with free improvisation or with improvised playing within open composition forms, but the collectively intuitive aspect, the emancipation from known music genres and the meditative dimension are especially emphasized by Stockhausen: "I try to avoid the word improvisation because it always means there are certain rules: of style, of rhythm, of harmony, of melody, of the order of sections, and so on". Nevertheless, one critic finds that intuitive music is not in essence irrational, but that for Stockhausen intuition must become a controllable ability, and therefore is an instrument of the project of modernity: "the investigation and instrumentalization of the world by controlled procedures".

At the 1968 Darmstadt composition seminar where the intuitive-music concept was central for the group composition Musik für ein Haus, Stockhausen himself emphasised that it has nothing to do with indeterminacy: "I do not want a spiritualistic seance—I want music! I do not mean anything mystical, but everything absolutely direct, from concrete experience. What I have in mind is not indeterminacy, but intuitive determinacy!."

See also
 Meditation music

References

Cited sources

Further reading

 Bailey, Derek. 1992. Improvisation: Its Nature and Practice in Music, revised edition. [UK]: The British Library National Sound Archive. US edition, supplemented with photographs between pages 58 and 59, New York: Da Capo Press, 1993. .
 Bergstrøm-Nielsen, Carl. 2008. "Das Bekannte ausschließen: Stockhausens "Intuitive Musik" und ihre Aufführungspraxis". MusikTexte, no. 117:63–66.
 Brinkmann, Reinhold. 1974. "Hören und Denken. Thesen zur Intuitiven Musik". Neue Zeitschrift für Musik 135:555–557.
 Davies, Hugh. 1975. "Stockhausen's Intuitive Music". Musics (April–May): 10–11. Via International Improvised Music Archive (IIMA).
 De Cock, Tom. 2016. "Some Insights on  the Practice of Stockhausen's Intuitive Music in General, and For Times To Come in Particular". Stockhausen instructions compiled by Martin Zingsheim from rehearsals with Ensemble für Intuitive Musik Weimar 1991 and 2005. 1991 text translated by Jayne Obst. (Retrieved 24 September 2018).
 Kohl, Jerome. 1978. "Intuitive Music and Serial Determinism: An Analysis of Stockhausen's Aus den sieben Tagen." In Theory Only 3, no. 2 (March): 7–19. PDF version (archive from 5 February 2012)
 Kurtz, Michael. 1988. "Aus den Sieben Tagen: Points de vue biographique et historique sur les compositions-textes de mai 1968." In Karlheinz Stockhausen (programme booklet). Paris: Contrechamps/. (In French)
 Nakaji, Masatsune. 1994. [http://www2.biglobe.ne.jp/~naxos/musik/fimusik.htm "Karlheinz Stockhausens Intuitive Musik: c'est Le Dispositif Chaosmique de Transformation". Genesis (The Bulletin of Kyoto University of Art and Design) vol. 1. 
 Stockhausen, Karlheinz. 1978. "Für kommende Zeiten: 17 Texte für Intuitive Musik (1968–70)". In Stockhausen's Texte 4:167–169. Cologne: DuMont Buchverlag, 1978. .
 : Karlheinz Stockhausens Intuitive Musik, PhD dissertation. (Cologne, Verlag der Apfel / Signale aus Köln), 2015.

External links 
 Intuitive Music Homepage, Carl Bergstrøm-Nielsen
 "What is Intuitive Music?", Steven Miller (drums), Harrison Goldberg (saxophone)

Musical techniques
Musical improvisation